Rhingia campestris is a species of hoverfly,  long, with a wingspan of . It is common across the Palearctic from March until November. It has a broad orange abdomen with a black line along the sides (the black line is absent along the sides of Rhingia rostrata), and has the distinctive long snout of all Rhingia species. Rhingia campestris is the main pollinator for many plant species and due to its long snout it can forage on tubulous flowers. Larvae are associated with cow dung. Adults males feed on nectar, while adult females feed on protein rich pollen, reflecting the cost of developing eggs.

Technical description

Description
External images
For terms see Morphology of DipteraWing length 5·5–7 mm Snout straight, longer than the  diameter of the eye in side view. Tergites with black hind edge and side margins and often with a black mark in the middle of the tergite. Pre-genital sternite black-haired. Tibiae red.
See references for determination

Distribution
Palearctic Fennoscandia South to the Pyrenees, Spain and the Mediterranean basin. Ireland East through Europe into European Russia and the Caucasus then to Siberia, Mongolia and the Russian Far East to the Pacific coast.

Biology
Habitat: Wood and wetland occurring most frequently on land where cows are grazed. Can feed at pink flowers which have concealed nectar sources, making them unusable by other flies with less extended mouthparts.

References

Eristalinae
Diptera of Europe
Insects described in 1822